Joy Banerjee (born 23 May 1963) is an Indian actor and politician. As an actor he is known for his work in Bengali Cinema.

He made his acting debut opposite Debashree Roy in Aparupa (1982) directed by Bidesh Sarkar. He was critically applauded for his role in Chopper (1987) directed by Nabyendu Chatterjee. He contested the 2014 Lok Sabha elections from Birbhum, West Bengal on BJP ticket against sitting MP and Tollywood actress Satabdi Roy. He also contested the 2019 Lok Sabha Election from Uluberia as BJP candidate against TMC sitting MP Sajda Ahmed.

Comments on Chinese products 
Joy Banerjee urged people in June 2020 to abandon Chinese products and threatened that all those who proceed to do so "should be beaten up and their homes ransacked." He also said, "A lesson should be taught to China. And this should start with a boycott of Chinese goods. We 're all supposed to boycott everything that is Chinese. Those who still use it should abstain from doing so. Otherwise, their legs should be broken and their home should be ransacked instantly".

References

External links 

Official website of Joy Banerjee
Full information of Joy Banerjee
Joy Banerjee on Twitter

Living people
1963 births
Bengali male actors
National Democratic Alliance candidates in the 2014 Indian general election
Bharatiya Janata Party politicians from West Bengal